is a single by Japanese boy band Kis-My-Ft2. It was released on December 24, 2014. It debuted at number one on the weekly Oricon Singles Chart.

References 

2014 singles
2014 songs
Kis-My-Ft2 songs
Oricon Weekly number-one singles
Japanese-language songs